If Ever may refer to:

 "If Ever" (3rd Storee song), 1999
 "If Ever" (Paula Fuga and Jack Johnson song), 2021